is a Japanese footballer who plays for Shonan Bellmare.

National team career
In October 2009, Okamoto was elected Japan U-17 national team for 2009 U-17 World Cup. He played full time in all 3 matches as center back.

Club statistics
Updated to 7 August 2022.

National team statistics

References

External links

Takuya Okamoto – Urawa Red Diamonds official site 
Profile at Shonan Bellmare
Takuya Okamoto – Yahoo! Japan sports 

Living people
1992 births
Association football people from Saitama Prefecture
Japanese footballers
Japan youth international footballers
J1 League players
J2 League players
Urawa Red Diamonds players
V-Varen Nagasaki players
Shonan Bellmare players
Association football defenders